California Baptist University (Cal Baptist or CBU) is a private Christian university in Riverside, California. Founded in 1950 as California Baptist College, it is affiliated with the California Southern Baptist Convention, an organization affiliated with the Southern Baptist Convention. CBU is accredited by the WASC Senior College and University Commission.

History

1950s
Founded in 1950 as California Baptist College in El Monte, California, the new college enrolled 120 students during its first year under the leadership of the first president, P. Boyd Smith. In 1953, the college moved under the wing of the California Southern Baptist Convention, the same year that the first edition of the Angelos, the college yearbook, was published. In 1954, the college received its charter from the state of California.

Soon, the college outgrew its facilities, and, in 1955, moved its campus to the then rural city of Riverside. The college moved to a more spacious 75.6 acre campus which already had constructed buildings that could be used for offices, classrooms, and living areas. What is now known as the Annie Gabriel Library, was the first to be built in 1921. In 1927, the original administration building was constructed whereas the W.E. James Building was built in 1934. The building which now houses the ceramics studio and boiler was constructed in 1938. In 1958, the college named its second president, Dr. Lloyd Simmons.

1960s and 1970s
In 1961 CBU received full accreditation by the Western Association of Schools and Colleges. In 1964, the college began expanding with the construction of the Lancer Arms apartment complex and the student population reached 500.

In 1968, Smith and Simmons residence halls were built and named in honor of the college's first two presidents. These new dorms allowed for higher enrollment at the college.

In 1971, Dr. James R. Staples was named as the third college president. Two years later, the Wallace Book of Life Theater was built. In 1978, the college's $800,000 note for the Riverside campus was finally paid and was burned in a college-wide celebration.

1980s and 1990s
Dr. Russell R. Tuck became the college's fourth president in 1984. The same year, the first graduate degree was granted and accreditation was received by the National Association of Schools of Music.

In 1991, Wanda's Place was established, an on-campus cafe named in honor of a popular long-time college employee. Three years later, Dr. Ronald L. Ellis was installed as the fifth college president and the next year school enrollment reached 1,000.

California Baptist College became the first college on the West Coast to receive accreditation by Association of College Business Schools and Programs in 1996. The next year enrollment reached 2,000.

In September 1998, California Baptist College officially became California Baptist University.

2000s
The campus again expanded in 2001 with the addition of the University Place Apartments.

The School of Music was established in 2002 with the new Dr. Bonnie G. Metcalf School of Education following in 2003. The same year, the new university complex, known as the Yeager Center, was opened housing classrooms, administration offices, the cafeteria, computer labs, and professors' offices.

In mid-2004, new housing complexes were built, and later in the year the university enrolled its first students in the Masters of Music degree program.

The School of Engineering was established in 2006. The inaugural class in the fall of 2007 had 55 students.

2010s
CBU added its College of Health Science in the fall of 2010 when enrollment exceeded 4,700 students. Also in September 2010, CBU also opened its third campus restaurant, Brisco's Village Café.

On August 30, 2011, nursing student Domaine Javier was expelled from California Baptist University for being a transgender woman. The reason given for Javier's expulsion was that she was accused of "committing or attempting to engage in fraud, or concealing identity" by having applied and being accepted as a woman to the school. A California state trial court handed partial victories to both the university and Javier. In 2014, Javier was awarded $4,000 plus attorney's fees.

On September 8, 2015, CBU offered its first doctoral degree, a Doctorate of Nursing Practice (DNP) through the School of Nursing.

The CBU Events Center opened in November 2017. The following year, the CBU Dennis and Carol Troesh Engineering Building was opened.

Campus

Annie Gabriel Library
The Annie Gabriel Library is named in honor of Miss Annie Gabriel, whose gifts enabled the initial development of the collection.

Holdings

In addition to more than 110,000 print volumes and 150,000 e-book holdings, the library provides access to over 30,000 journals titles and 79 databases.  The library has a growing collection of more than 17,000 DVDs and streaming videos.  Along with a research computer lab, the library is equipped with wireless service throughout the building.

Special Collections

 The Southern Baptist Depository and Archive offers books, journals, convention and association annuals, state newspapers, Sunday school curriculum materials and other Southern Baptist publications. 
 The California Baptist University Queenie Simmons Archive provides access to information on the history of CBU through its collection of yearbooks, campus publications, photographs and other historical documents, in addition to the collected papers of S. G. Posey, Lawrence Nelson, and Melodie Yocum.
 The P. Boyd Smith Hymnology Collection contains more than 2,100 volumes spanning three centuries and representing more than twenty languages. It is a valuable resource for hymnologists and musicologists, as well as historians of church music.
 The Wallace Collection of more than 2,400 volumes comprises a personal collection of evangelism materials given to the institution in remembrance of Dr. D. E. Wallace, former Professor of Bible and Religious Education.
 The Nie Wieder! Collection is a growing collection of resources for students researching the Holocaust and its implications for Jewish-Christian relations.

School architecture
California Baptist University is known in the city of Riverside for its Mission Revival style architecture. Many of the older structures on campus were built during the 1920s and 30s, a time when this particular style was popular. The Mission Inn in downtown Riverside is also built in the Mission Revival style. Buildings that have been built on campus have followed this architectural tradition.

In 2004, CBU was recognized in a November 2004 article in the American School and University magazine, which recognizes education design excellence, for the construction of the Yeager Center, by Kroh/Broeske Architects in Riverside. The university also won honors from the city of Riverside.

In 2005 the JoAnn Hawkins Music Building was built. It houses the Collinsworth School of Music.

A new building for CBU's Jabs School of Business was dedicated and opened for use in August 2012.

A new Recreation Center building was dedicated in January 2013 offering a wide range of physical fitness options to students and employees.

A new Events Center opened in November 2017 to host various university sports and commencement events.

A new building for CBU's Gordon and Jill Bourns College of Engineering, the Dennis and Carol Troesh Engineering Building, was dedicated and opened for use in July 2018.

A new main entrance to the CBU campus was opened in August 2019.

On September 20, 2019, CBU dedicated a new Athletic Performance Center featuring a 10,800 square-foot weight room, the largest such facility for an NCAA Division I non-football institution in the state of California.

Student activities

Annual campus traditions
CBU's Campus Activities office hosts a range of annual social and recreational events, including: Fortuna Bowl, an intramural flag football championship game with men's and women's teams on the campus front lawn in November; Midnight Madness, a high-energy event which kicks off the basketball season by introducing the men's and women's basketball teams to hundreds of cheering students packed into the events center. School spirit is raised with games and relays like the dunk contest and three-point shootout, and free food and prizes for the fans; Yule, a formal dinner and night of entertainment at a premier Southern California venue where the year's Mr. & Ms. CBU are revealed in early December; Late Night Breakfast, held during Finals Week of each semester, where school faculty and staff serve up breakfast to students; and TWIRP (The Woman Is Required to Pay), a week-long event where female students invite male students to fun activities and events throughout the week.  Highlights of the week include: a Barn Dance, complete with a caller, square dancing, and costume contest, on- and off-campus events including concerts, Angels and Dodgers baseball games, and trips to Disneyland, Sky Zone and other Southern California excursions.

International Service Projects
International Service Projects, or ISP, is the CBU-based program through which students can serve overseas for three weeks during the summer. An ISP team is generally made up of 8–10 students and is led by a CBU faculty or staff member. Since being established in 1997, ISP teams have served in more than 40 countries on six continents. While overseas, the teams participate in a variety of ministries that may include music, drama, sports, ethnography, children's ministry, and teaching English. Student can also participate in United States Service Projects, or USPs, which are arranged similarly to ISPs but target U.S. destinations.

Athletics

The California Baptist (Cal Baptist) athletic teams are called the Lancers. The university is a member of the Division I level of the National Collegiate Athletic Association (NCAA), primarily competing in the Western Athletic Conference (WAC) for most of its sports since the 2018–19 academic year; while the men's water polo team competes in the Western Water Polo Association (WWPA); and the women's water polo team competes in the Golden Coast Conference (GCC). The Lancers previously competed in the Pacific West Conference (PacWest) of the NCAA Division II ranks from 2011–12 to 2017–18; and in the Golden State Athletic Conference (GSAC) of the National Association of Intercollegiate Athletics (NAIA) from 1987–88 to 2010–11.

Cal Baptist competes in 21 intercollegiate varsity sports: Men's sports include baseball, basketball, cross country, golf, soccer, swimming & diving, track (distance), water polo and wrestling; while women's sports include basketball, cross country, golf, soccer, softball, stunt, swimming & diving, track (distance), volleyball and water polo; and co-ed sports include cheerleading and dance. Women's beach volleyball will be a varsity sport in the future.

Academics

Schools
 College of Health Science 
 Department of Kinesiology
 Department of Physician Assistant Studies
 Department of Public Health Sciences
 Department of Allied Health Professions
 Department of Communication Sciences and Disorders 
 College of Architecture, Visual Art and Design
 Department of Architecture
 Department of Graphic Design
 Department of Photography
 Department of Film
 Department of Visual Arts
 College of Arts and Sciences
 Department of Aviation Science
Department of Biological Sciences
Department of Chemical Sciences
 Department of Communication Arts
 Department of History and Government
Department of Mathematical Sciences
 Department of Modern Languages & Literature
 Gordon and Jill Bourns College of Engineering
 Department of Aerospace, Industrial and Mechanical Engineering
 Department of Biomedical Engineering
 Department of Chemical Engineering
 Department of Civil Engineering and Construction Management
 Department of Computing, Software and Data Sciences
 Department of Electrical and Computer Engineering
 Dr. Bonnie G. Metcalf School of Education
 Dr. Robert K. Jabs School of Business
 College of Behavioral and Social Sciences
 School of Christian Ministries
 College of Nursing
 Shelby and Ferne Collinsworth School of Music

Incorporation, accreditations and memberships 
California Baptist University is accredited by the Accrediting Commission for Senior Colleges and Universities of the Western Association of Schools and Colleges. In March 2011, WASC awarded a 10-year accreditation reaffirmation to the university, the maximum accreditation period granted by WASC.  It is the first time in CBU's more than 60-year history that the institution has received the maximum accreditation extension.

In addition, CBU's various schools and colleges hold accreditations from and memberships with organizations related to their specific disciplines. These accreditations and memberships currently include:
 CBU's Dr. Robert K. Jabs School of Business is nationally accredited by the Association of Collegiate Business Schools and Programs (ACBSP).
 CBU's Shelby and Ferne Collinsworth School of Music is accredited by the National Association of Schools of Music (NASM).
 Teacher education programs offered by CBU's Dr. Bonnie G. Metcalf School of Educations are approved by the California Commission on Teacher Credentialing (CTC). Approval has been given for both multiple-subject and single-subject credential programs.
 The Master of Science in Athletic Training (MSAT) program offered by CBU's Department of Kinesiology is accredited by the CAATE
 CBU's nursing program offered by CBU's School of Nursing is approved by the Board of Registered Nurses (BRN) and is accredited by the Commission on Collegiate Nursing Education (CCNE).
 CBU's bachelor's degree programs in biomedical engineering (BSBME), chemical engineering (BS), civil engineering (BSCE), electrical and computer engineering (BSECE) and mechanical engineering (BSME) are accredited by the Engineering Accreditation Commission of the Accreditation Board for Engineering and Technology (ABET)
CBU's Master of Public Health (MPH) program is accredited by the Council on Education for Public Health (CEPH).

The university is a member of the American Association of Higher Education, the Association of Independent California Colleges and Universities, the International Association of Baptist Colleges and Universities, the Council for Christian Colleges and Universities, and the Servicemembers Opportunity Colleges.

CBU is affiliated with LECOM, the largest medical school in the United States, offering qualified students early acceptance to their medical, dental, and pharmacy schools.

California Baptist University is incorporated under the laws of the State of California as a university of arts and sciences, and as such grants the degrees of Bachelor of Applied Theology, Bachelor of Arts, Bachelor of Science, Master of Architecture, Master of Arts, Master of Business Administration, Master of Music, Master of public health, Master of Social Work, Master of Science, Doctor of Business Administration, Doctor of Psychology, and Doctor of Nursing Practice.

Notable alumni
Fraser Kershaw (2006) Activist, host of the film, Behind the Water 
Brent Kutzle Bassist and cellist for the pop rock band OneRepublic.
Domaine Javier Former Nursing student, contestant on Worst Cooks in America. Sued California Baptist University for unlawful expulsion.
Dustin-Leigh Konzelman (2005) Miss California contestant in the 2006 Miss America Pageant. Also a contestant on season 10 and the All-Star edition of the CBS reality show The Amazing Race.
Rick Warren (1976) Author of The Purpose Driven Life and founding and pastor emeritus of Saddleback Church
Drew Shirley (1996) Guitarist of the Christian rock band Switchfoot. His first band, All Together Separate, originated at the university and was made up of members of the student body.
Nathan Fletcher (1997) Member of the California State Assembly (R-San Diego)

Notes

References

External links
 
 CBU athletics website

 
Universities and colleges affiliated with the Southern Baptist Convention
Education in Riverside, California
Universities and colleges in Riverside County, California
Educational institutions established in 1950
Schools accredited by the Western Association of Schools and Colleges
1950 establishments in California
Baptist Christianity in California
Council for Christian Colleges and Universities
Private universities and colleges in California